The WWF Light Heavyweight Championship was a professional wrestling cruiserweight championship operated by the World Wrestling Federation (WWF). From 1981 through the 1990s, the WWF had a business partnership with the Universal Wrestling Association (UWA), a Mexican lucha libre-based promotion, which resulted in the creation of the WWF Light Heavyweight Championship for the UWA. When the UWA ceased operations in 1995, the title traveled to the Japanese promotions Michinoku Pro Wrestling (MPW) and New Japan Pro-Wrestling (NJPW). In 1997, as a result of the WWF owning the trademarks to the championship, NJPW was forced to return the title to the WWF. One month later, the WWF began operating the title in the United States. After World Championship Wrestling (WCW) and its assets were acquired by the WWF in March 2001, the conceptually similar WCW Cruiserweight Championship was also used by the promotion, before completely replacing the Light Heavyweight Championship.

Title reigns were determined by professional wrestling matches that involved wrestlers in pre-existing scripted feuds, plots, and storylines or were awarded the title due to scripted circumstances. Wrestlers were portrayed as either villains or heroes as they followed a series of tension-building events, which culminated in a match or series of matches for the championship. The title was won in Japan, Mexico, and 11 American states. The first champion to be recognized by the UWA was Perro Aguayo, who won the title in a tournament final in March 1981. Shinjiro Otani was the final champion recognized by the UWA before the title was returned to the WWF; he had won the title in August 1997. Although his reign is unrecognized by the WWF, Ultimo Dragon is the only wrestler to hold a WWF championship and a WCW championship at the same time before WWF's purchase of WCW. The first champion recognized by the WWF was Taka Michinoku, who won the title in a tournament final on December 7, 1997. After winning the championship in August 2001, X-Pac was the final wrestler to have held the title before it was replaced by the Cruiserweight Championship. Aguayo and Villano III held the title the most times, with eight. At 826 days, Villano III's reign from 1984 to 1986 was the longest in the title's history. Perro Aguayo and Scotty 2 Hotty have the shortest reign, at eight days. Overall, there were 45 title reigns.

Reigns

Recognition by the UWA/MPW/NJPW

Recognition by the WWF

Combined reigns recognized by the UWA/MPW/NJPW

Combined reigns recognized by WWE

See also
WWE Cruiserweight Championship (1996–2007)
List of WWE Cruiserweight Champions (1996–2007)

References
General
 
  
Specific

External links
Official WWF Light Heavyweight Championship title history
WWF Light Heavyweight Championship at Wrestling-Titles.com

WWE championships lists